Lachavious Simmons (born September 12, 1996) is an American football offensive tackle and guard for the Arizona Cardinals of the National Football League (NFL). He played college football at Tennessee State.

College career
A native of Selma, Alabama, Simmons started six games at left guard as a junior at Tennessee State in 2018. He started 12 games in 2019 as left guard and left tackle and helped propel an offense that averaged over 400 yards per game. Simmons was a first-team all-Ohio Valley Conference selection. He also played in the Hula Bowl all-star game.

Professional career

Chicago Bears
Simmons was selected by the Chicago Bears with the 227th overall pick in the seventh round of the 2020 NFL Draft. He was the only player from a historically black college and university selected in the draft. He signed a four-year rookie contract with the team on July 21. He was released as part of final roster cuts on September 5, and was added to the practice squad the following day. He was promoted to the active roster on November 3, 2020. He was placed on the reserve/COVID-19 list by the team on November 8, 2020, and activated on November 20.

On August 30, 2022, Simmons was waived by the Bears and signed to the practice squad the next day. He was released by the team on September 12.

Arizona Cardinals
On September 20, 2022, Simmons signed with the practice squad of the Arizona Cardinals. He was placed on the practice squad/injured list on October 5, 2022. He was activated from the practice squad/injured list on December 28, 2022. He signed a reserve/future contract on January 11, 2023.

References

External links
Chicago Bears bio
Tennessee State Tigers bio

1996 births
Living people
Players of American football from Alabama
Sportspeople from Selma, Alabama
American football offensive guards
Tennessee State Tigers football players
Chicago Bears players
Arizona Cardinals players